The Scottish Premier Reserve League was the top reserve team league for Scottish football teams. The competition started at the same time as the inauguration of the Scottish Premier League in the 1998–99 season. It was initially an under-21 league, with a quota of five players over the age limit allowed per team in any match. The league was discontinued after the 2008–09 season. Since then, alternative structures have been mooted, such as allowing the bigger clubs to field reserve teams in the lower divisions of the Scottish Football League.

Past winners

Under-21 League

Reserve League

See also
SPFL Development League (originally the concurrent SPL under-18 competition from 1998, taken over by the Scottish Professional Football League and changed to under-20s)
SPFL Reserve League (a similar reserves competition operated by the SPFL since 2018, replacing the above Development League)

References

External links 
 News
 Tables
 Fixtures

Reserve football leagues in Europe
Scottish Premier League
Defunct football leagues in Scotland
1998 establishments in Scotland
2009 disestablishments in Scotland